Régis Clère (15 August 1956 – 9 June 2012) was a French professional road bicycle racer.

Clère was born in Langres.  During his career, he won three stages in the Tour de France. He won one of these stages, in the 1987 Tour de France, after he was almost eliminated after finishing outside the time limit in the previous stage, but the Tour de France jury allowed him to continue the race. He also competed in the individual road race event at the 1980 Summer Olympics.

Clère died, aged 55, in Dijon during a surgical procedure.

Major results

1981
Langres
Vuelta a España
Winner prologue and stage 15B
Les Ormes
1982
Lamballe
 National Road Race Championship
Prix de Villeneuve d'Ascq
Tour de France:
Winner Combativity award
1983
Tour de France:
Winner stage 11
1987
Meymac
Route du Berry/Trophée Sitram
Tour Midi-Pyrénées
Tour de France:
Winner stages 16 and 23

References

External links 

Official Tour de France results for Régis Clère

1956 births
2012 deaths
People from Langres
French male cyclists
French Tour de France stage winners
French Vuelta a España stage winners
Olympic cyclists of France
Cyclists at the 1980 Summer Olympics
Sportspeople from Haute-Marne
Cyclists from Grand Est